Le Panorama was a radio show on France Culture, which ran daily between 12-1 from 1968 until 1998. It dealt with cultural affairs, and was presented by: 
 Jacques Duchateau
 Michel Bidlowski
 Pascale Casanova 
 David Bénichou
 Roger Dadoune
 Gilbert Lascault
 Jean-Maurice de Montremy
 Lionel Richard
 Jean Pierre Salgas
 Véronique Schiltz
 Nadine Vasseur.

External links 
Show archives of Panorama from France Culture since January 1994.
Listen to an episode of "le Panorama" presented by Jean-Maurice de Montremy from 17 September 1990

French public radio programs
Radio France
French news radio programs
1968 radio programme debuts